Mimasarta is a genus of moths of the family Crambidae. It contains only one species, Mimasarta niveifascialis, which is found in Central Asia.

References

Natural History Museum Lepidoptera genus database

Pyraustinae
Taxa named by Émile Louis Ragonot
Monotypic moth genera
Crambidae genera